West Wheatfield Township is a township in Indiana County, Pennsylvania, United States. The population was 2,164 at the 2020 census. The township includes the communities of Centerville, Climax, Clyde, Conpitt Junction, Germany, Heshbon, India, and Robinson.

History
The Bridge in West Wheatfield Township was listed on the National Register of Historic Places in 1988.

Geography
According to the United States Census Bureau, the township has a total area of 32.0 square miles (82.8 km2), of which 31.6 square miles (81.9 km2)  is land and 0.3 square mile (0.9 km2)  (1.10%) is water.

Demographics

As of the census of 2000, there were 2,375 people, 903 households, and 704 families residing in the township.  The population density was 75.1 people per square mile (29.0/km2).  There were 967 housing units at an average density of 30.6/sq mi (11.8/km2).  The racial makeup of the township was 99.37% White, 0.08% African American, 0.08% Native American, 0.17% Asian, 0.08% from other races, and 0.21% from two or more races. Hispanic or Latino of any race were 0.42% of the population.

There were 903 households, out of which 30.7% had children under the age of 18 living with them, 65.3% were married couples living together, 8.7% had a female householder with no husband present, and 22.0% were non-families. 19.8% of all households were made up of individuals, and 9.0% had someone living alone who was 65 years of age or older.  The average household size was 2.63 and the average family size was 2.99.

In the township the population was spread out, with 23.5% under the age of 18, 8.7% from 18 to 24, 27.5% from 25 to 44, 26.2% from 45 to 64, and 14.1% who were 65 years of age or older.  The median age was 39 years. For every 100 females there were 105.8 males.  For every 100 females age 18 and over, there were 100.0 males.

The median income for a household in the township was $31,224, and the median income for a family was $34,355. Males had a median income of $29,087 versus $21,023 for females. The per capita income for the township was $14,228.  About 8.6% of families and 11.4% of the population were below the poverty line, including 14.8% of those under age 18 and 7.9% of those age 65 or over.

References

Townships in Indiana County, Pennsylvania
Townships in Pennsylvania